= Lar railway station =

Pakistani station

General information
- Owner: Ministry of Railways

Other information
- Station code: LAZ

History
- Former names: Great Indian Peninsula Railway

Lar railway station (Urdu: لاڑ ریلوے اسٹیشن) is a railway station in Pakistan.

== See also ==
- List of railway stations in Pakistan
- Pakistan Railways
